"I Want To Be Loved (But Only By You)" is a 1947 ballad written by  and recorded by Savannah Churchill and The Sentimentalists.  The single was Savannah Churchill's most successful release on the R&B charts, spending six months on the chart and reaching number one on the R&B Juke Box chart.

Cover versions

Also in 1947, Lionel Hampton and His Hamptonians, reached number two on the R&B Juke Box chart, with their version of the song.
Also in 1947, Dinah Washington recorded the song. It was released as a single Stairway to the Stars c/w I Want to be Loved. It is often confused with her 1950 single I Wanna Be Loved (written by Johnny Green, Edward Heyman and Billy Rose.)
In 1956 Johnnie Ray recorded a version for Columbia Records.
In 1969 Mina covered the song on her album Mina for You.

See also
 Billboard Most-Played Race Records of 1947
 List of Billboard number-one R&B singles of the 1940s

References

1947 songs
Rhythm and blues ballads
Lionel Hampton songs
Dinah Washington songs
Johnnie Ray songs